Mwaluganje Elephant Sanctuary (MES) is a community-owned elephant park, a conservation area for elephants and Encephalartos cycads in Kwale County, Kenya.

Location
It is located 45 km southwest of Mombasa and is  adjacent to the  Shimba Hills National Reserve. The sanctuary was formed in the early 1990s as a cooperative project between the people of the surrounding Mwaluganje community, United States Agency for International Development, and the Born Free Foundation and the Eden Wildlife Trust.

Ecotourism
MES is an example of ecotourism, as well as community-based-conservation efforts, both of which are very recent trends in conservation management. In this community-based program, the local people have leased their  privately owned property to a community-based trust.

The trust manages the sanctuary for the conservation and preservation of the elephants. In addition it is a  valuable source of  revenue for the  local people, re through  monies generated by eco-tourism and gate entrance fees. The area  is off the Shimba Hills escarpment in Kwale County and is on the migratory route leading to Tsavo East National Reserve. Some of the revenue generating activities include creating paper from elephant dung, bee keeping (honey products)and biofuel
.     3.

References
 

Parks in Kenya
Zoos in Kenya
Wildlife sanctuaries of Kenya
Kwale County
Coast Province
Elephant conservation